The D class of 1887 were Phoenix-built locomotives to be used on Victorian Railways.

All 20 examples were scrapped, the last one (D 194) was scrapped in 1928.

References

Specific

4-4-0 locomotives
D class 1887
Railway locomotives introduced in 1887
Broad gauge locomotives in Australia
Scrapped locomotives
Phoenix locomotives